Hagigah or Chagigah (Hebrew: חגיגה, lit. "Festival Offering") is one of the tractates comprising Moed, one of the six orders of the Mishnah, a collection of Jewish traditions included in the Talmud. It deals with the Three Pilgrimage Festivals (Passover, Shavuot, Sukkot) and the pilgrimage offering that men were supposed to bring in Jerusalem. At the middle of the second chapter, the text discusses topics of ritual purity.

The tractate contains three chapters, spanning 27 pages in the Vilna Edition Shas of the Babylonian Talmud, making it relatively short. The second chapter contains much estoric aggadah, describing creation, and the Merkavah. Its content is relatively light and uncomplicated, except for the third chapter.

References

External links 
English translation

External links
 Mishnah Chagigah text in Hebrew
 Full Hebrew and English text of the Mishnah for tractate Chagigah on Sefaria
Full Hebrew and English text of the Talmud Bavli for tractate Chagigah on Sefaria
Full Hebrew and English text of the Talmud Yerushalmi for tractate Chagigah on Sefaria
Full Hebrew text of the Tosefta for tractate Chagigah on Sefaria